Augusta Vera Duthie (18 July 1881 Belvidere, Knysna – 8 August 1963 Belvidere, Knysna) was a South African botanist who studied the plants of the Western Cape and was a popular teacher who lectured on cryptogamic botany. She was the first university lecturer in botany who was entirely educated in South Africa.

Early life and education
One of five children, she was born to Archibald Hamilton and Augusta Vera Duthie and in Knysna, South Africa. She obtained a B.A. from Huguenot College in 1901, a M.A. from South African College in 1910, and a D.Sc. from University of South Africa in 1929.

Academic career
She was appointed as botany lecturer at Victoria College, now University of Stellenbosch in 1902. In 1912, she visited Cambridge University and worked with Albert Seward. In 1929, she completed flora of the Stellenbosch Flats, an alluvial area surrounding the college. After her retirement 1939, she returned to manage her family farm Belvidere where she died in 1963. In her will she bequeathed a sum of money to St Andrew's College, where she had taught, in order to fund scholarships.

Eponyms
 Duthiastrum
 Duthie's golden mole Chlorotalpa duthieae Broom
 Impatiens duthieae
 Ischyrolepis duthieae (Pillans) H. P. Linder
 Ornithogalum duthiae
 Psilocaulon duthieae
 Romulea duthieae
 Ruschia duthiae 
 Stomatium duthieae

Major works

Commemoration
She is commemorated by the stained glass window in the north wall of the Holy Trinity Church in Belvidere near Knysna, the church was founded by her ancestor, Thomas Henry Duthie.

Reference List

External links

1881 births
1963 deaths
20th-century South African women scientists
20th-century South African botanists
South African women botanists
South African mycologists
University of South Africa alumni
Academic staff of Stellenbosch University